George Rochberg (July 5, 1918May 29, 2005) was an American composer of contemporary classical music. Long a serial composer, Rochberg abandoned the practice following the death of his teenage son in 1964; he claimed this compositional technique had proved inadequate to express his grief and had found it empty of expressive intent. By the 1970s, Rochberg's use of tonal passages in his music had provoked controversy among critics and fellow composers. A professor at the University of Pennsylvania until 1983, Rochberg also served as chairman of its music department until 1968. He became the first Annenberg Professor of the Humanities in 1978.

Life
Born in Paterson, New Jersey, Rochberg attended first the Mannes College of Music, where his teachers included George Szell and Hans Weisse, then the Curtis Institute of Music, where he studied with Rosario Scalero and Gian Carlo Menotti. He served in the United States Army in the infantry during World War II. He was Jewish.

Rochberg served as chairman of the music department at the University of Pennsylvania until 1968 and continued to teach there until 1983. In 1978, he was named the first Annenberg Professor of the Humanities.

He married Gene Rosenfeld in 1941, and had two children, Paul and Francesca. In 1964, his son died of a brain tumor.

Rochberg died in Bryn Mawr, Pennsylvania, in 2005, aged 86. Most of his works are held in the archive of the Paul Sacher Foundation in Basel, Switzerland. Some can also be found in the Music Division of the New York Public Library, the Library of Congress in Washington D.C., the Lincoln Center in New York City, the University of Pennsylvania, Curtis Institute of Music, Philadelphia, and the City University of New York.

Music

A longtime exponent of serialism, Rochberg abandoned this compositional technique upon the death of his teenage son in 1964. He said he had found serialism expressively empty and that it had proved an inadequate means for him to express his grief and rage. By the 1970s, Rochberg had become controversial for the use of tonal passages in his music. His use of tonality first became widely known through the String Quartet No. 3 (1972), which includes an entire set of variations that are in the style of late Beethoven. Another movement of the quartet contains passages reminiscent of the music of Gustav Mahler. This use of tonality caused critics to classify him as a neoromantic composer. He compared atonality to abstract art and tonality to concrete art and compared his artistic evolution with the painter Philip Guston's, saying "the tension between concreteness and abstraction" is a fundamental issue for both of them. His music has also been described as neoconservative postmodernism

Of the works Rochberg composed early in his career, his Symphony No. 2 (1955–56) stands out as one of the most accomplished serial compositions by an American composer. He is perhaps best known for his String Quartets Nos. 3–6 (1972–78). Rochberg conceived Nos. 4–6 as a set and named them the "Concord Quartets" after the Concord String Quartet, which premiered and recorded the works. The String Quartet No. 6 includes a set of variations on Pachelbel's Canon in D.

A few of his works were musical collages of quotations from other composers. "Contra Mortem et Tempus", for example, contains passages from Pierre Boulez, Luciano Berio, Edgard Varèse and Charles Ives.

Symphonies Nos. 1, 2, and 5, and the Violin Concerto were recorded in 2001–2002 by the Rundfunk-Sinfonieorchester Saarbrücken and conductor Christopher Lyndon-Gee and released on the Naxos label.

Legacy
For notable students 

James Freeman, musician and teacher at Swarthmore College, said this about Rochberg and serialism: "If George Rochberg can do something like that, there's nothing that I can't do and get away with it. I don't have to write 12-tone music; I can if I want to. I can write stuff that sounds like Brahms. I can do anything I want. I'm free. And that was an extraordinary feeling in the late 1960s for young composers, I think, many of whom felt really constrained to write serial music."

Writings
Rochberg's collected essays were published by the University of Michigan Press in 1984 as The Aesthetics of Survival. A revised and expanded edition, published shortly before his death, was awarded an ASCAP Deems Taylor Award in 2006..Selections from his correspondence with the Canadian composer István Anhalt were published in 2007 by Wilfrid Laurier University Press. His memoirs, Five Lines, Four Spaces, were published by the University of Illinois Press in May 2009.

Works

Stage
The Confidence Man, an opera in two parts (1982); libretto by Gene Rochberg, based on the novel of the same name by Herman Melville

Orchestral
Symphonies
Symphony No. 1 (1948–49; revised 1977; 2003)
Symphony No. 2 (1955–56)
Symphony No. 3, for double chorus, chamber chorus, soloists, and large orchestra (1966–69)
Symphony No. 4 (1976)
Symphony No. 5 (1984)
Symphony No. 6 (1986–87)
Canto Sacra, for small orchestra (1954)
Cheltenham Concerto, for small orchestra (1958)
Imago Mundi, for large orchestra (1973)
Night Music, for orchestra with cello solo (1948) (based on 2nd movement of Symphony No. 1)
Music for the Magic Theater, for small orchestra (1965–69)
Time-Span I (1960)
Time-Span II (1965)
Transcendental Variations, for string orchestra (based on 3rd movement of String Quartet No. 3) (1975)
Zodiac (A Circle of 12 Pieces), (1964–65) (orchestration of the piano work Twelve Bagatelles)

Concerti
Clarinet Concerto (1996)
Oboe Concerto (1983), written for and premiered by Joe Robinson
Violin Concerto (1974; rev. 2001), written for and premiered by Isaac Stern with the Pittsburgh Symphony Orchestra, Donald Johanos conducting. The concerto was commissioned by the Steinfirst family in memory of Donald Steinfirst, the music critic for over 35 years of the Pittsburgh Post-Gazette which participated in the commission. Long a friend of Mr. Steinfirst, Isaac Stern consulted with the family. He premiered and recorded the concerto in Pittsburgh, and included it in his repertoire for several years.
Eden: Out of Time and Out of Space, for guitar and ensemble (1998)

Wind ensemble
Black Sounds, for winds and percussion (1965)
Apocalyptica, for large wind ensemble (1964)

Chamber

2 players
Duo for Oboe and Bassoon (1946; rev. 1969)
Duo Concertante, for violin and cello (1955–59)
Dialogues, for clarinet and piano (1957–58)
La bocca della verita, for oboe and piano (1958–59); version for violin and piano (1964)
Ricordanza Soliloquy, for cello and piano (1972)
Slow Fires of Autumn (Ukiyo II), for flute and harp (1978–79)
Viola Sonata (1979)
Between Two Worlds (Ukiyo III), for flute and piano (1982)
Violin Sonata (1988)
Muse of Fire, for flute and guitar (1989–90)
Ora pro nobis, for flute and guitar (1989)
Rhapsody and Prayer, for violin and piano (1989)

3 players
Piano trios
Piano Trio No. 1 (1963)
Piano Trio No. 2 (1985)
Piano Trio No. 3 Summer (1990)
Trio for Clarinet, Horn, and Piano (1980) see recording below

4 players
String quartets
String Quartet No. 1 (1952)
String Quartet No. 2, with soprano (1959–61)
String Quartet No. 3 (1972)
String Quartet No. 4 (1977)
String Quartet No. 5 (1978)
String Quartet No. 6 (1978)
String Quartet No. 7, with baritone (1979)
Contra Mortem et Tempus, for violin, flute, clarinet, and piano (1965)
Piano Quartet (1983)

5 or more players
Chamber Symphony for Nine Instruments (1953)
Serenata d'estate, for six instruments (1955)
Electrikaleidoscope, for an amplified ensemble of flute, clarinet, cello, piano, and electric piano (1972)
Quintet for piano and string quartet (1975)
Octet: A Grand Fantasia, for flute, clarinet, horn, piano, violin, viola, cello, and double bass (1980)
String Quintet (1982)
To the Dark Wood, for wind quintet (1985)

Instrumental
50 Caprice Variations, for violin (1970)
American Bouquet, for guitar (1991)

Keyboard
Arioso (1959)
Bartokiana (1959)
Book of Contrapuntal Pieces for Keyboard Instruments (1979)
Carnival Music, for piano (1971)
Circles of Fire, for two pianos (1996–1997)
Four Short Sonatas, for piano (1984)
Nach Bach: Fantasia, for harpsichord or piano (1966)
Partita-Variations, for piano (1976)
Sonata Seria, for piano (1948/98)
Sonata-Fantasia, for piano (1956)
Three Elegiac Pieces, for piano (1945/48/98)
Twelve Bagatelles, for piano (1952)
Variations on an Original Theme, for piano (1941)

Vocal/Choral
Behold, My Servant, for mixed chorus, a capella (1973)
Blake Songs, for soprano and chamber ensemble (1957; rev. 1962)
David, the Psalmist, for tenor and orchestra (1954)
Eleven Songs to Poems of Paul Rochberg, for mezzo-soprano and piano (1969)
Fantasies, for voice and piano (1971)
Four Songs of Solomon, for voice and piano (1946)
Music for The Alchemist, for soprano and eleven players (1966; rev. 1968)Passions [According to the Twentieth Century], for singers, jazz quintet, brass ensemble, percussion, piano, and tape (1967)Phaedra, monodrama for mezzo-soprano and orchestra (1973–74)Sacred Song of Reconciliation (Mizmor L'piyus), for baritone and orchestra (1970)Seven Early Love Songs, for voice and piano (1991)Songs in Praise of Krishna, for soprano and piano (1970)Songs of Inanna and Dumuzi, for alto and piano (1977)Tableaux, for soprano, two speakers, small men's chorus, and twelve players (1968)Three Cantes Flamencos, for high baritone (1969)Three Psalms, for mixed chorus, a capella (1954)

Awards and recognitions
1950–1951 – Fulbright Fellow
1950–52 – Fellow of American Academy in Rome
1952 – George Gershwin Memorial Award for Night Music1956 – Society for the Publication of American Music award for String Quartet No. 11956 – Guggenheim Fellowship
1959 – First prize in Italian ISCM International Music Competition for Cheltenham Concerto1961 – Naumburg Recording Award for Symphony No. 21962 – Honorary degree from Montclair State University
1964 – Honorary degree from University of the Arts
1966 – Prix Italia for Black Sounds1966 – Guggenheim Fellowship
1972 – Naumburg Chamber Composition Award for String Quartet No. 31972–74 – National Endowment for the Arts Grants
1979 – Kennedy Center Friedhelm Award for String Quartet No. 41980 – Honorary degree from University of Michigan
1985 – Honorary degree from University of Pennsylvania
1985 – Gold Medal at Brandeis Creative Arts Awards
1986 – Lancaster Symphony Composers Award
1987 – University of Bridgeport's Andre and Clara Mertens Contemporary Composer Award
1987 – Alfred I. duPont Composer's Award
1991 – Bellagio artist in residence
1994 – Honorary degree from Miami University
1997 – Longy School of Music Distinguished Achievement Award
1998 – Grammy Award (nominated) "String Quartet No. 3"
1999 – ASCAP Lifetime Achievement Award
2004 – Grammy Award (nominated) "String Quartet No. 5"
2006 – Deems Taylor Award for The Aesthetics of Survival: A Composer's View of Twentieth-Century MusicReferences

Sources

 
 

 
 

Further reading
 

External links

George Rochberg's page at Theodore Presser Company
George Rochberg's Revolution by Michael Linton, Copyright (c) 1998 First Things 84 (June/July 1998): 18–20.
Horsley, Paul J. "George Rochberg: Volume One". Liner note essay. New World Records.
Interview with George Rochberg, March 11, 1986
Art of the States: George Rochberg, sound files: Circles of Fire, Duo Concertante, Nach Bach''
 George Rochberg: Trio for Clarinet, Horn, and Piano: Liberamente e molto espressivo; allegro con moto; Adagio; Adagio/Allegro giocosamente. Nobuko Igarashi (clarinet), Robert Patterson (horn), Adam Bowles (piano) of the Luna Nova Ensemble

1918 births
2005 deaths
20th-century classical composers
Twelve-tone and serial composers
Curtis Institute of Music alumni
Jewish classical composers
Musicians from Paterson, New Jersey
Pupils of Rosario Scalero
United States Army soldiers
University of Pennsylvania faculty
Male classical composers
20th-century American male musicians
Mannes School of Music alumni